Viriato may refer to:

 Lusitânia, Portuguese name of Lusitania, an ancient Iberian Roman province located where modern Portugal and part of western Spain lie.
 Lusitânia, proper name of star HD 45652, in the constellation of Monoceros.